Cropani is a comune and town in the province of Catanzaro in the Calabria region of Italy.
Two fractions are part of the municipal territory: Cropani Marina and Cuturella. According to tradition, the ship carrying the relics of Mark the Evangelist from Alexandria to Venice found refuge on the coasts of Cropani. In gratitude, the captain gave the city a relic (a fragment of a kneecap) preserved in its Romanesque cathedral.

History
The word "Cropani" derives from the Greek "kropos", which literally means "manure", in the meaning of "rich, fertile land". It was assumed that the first settlements arose following the emigration of the inhabitants of two cities destroyed or disappeared: Erapolis, near the river Crocchio, and Atenapolis located near the river Simeri.
Although its origin is uncertain, some sources agree with the Byzantine one, during the sixth century, when Basilian monks came and chose this place because it was strategic to defend itself against foreign attacks. However, the town already existed around the 1800s. In this regard, the seventeenth-century cropanese historian Giovanni Fiore said that in 831 some Venetian merchants arrived near Cropani, returning from Alexandria in Egypt where they had taken the remains of Saint Mark the Evangelist.

References 

Cities and towns in Calabria